is a Japanese fighting video game developed by Ganbarion and published by Bandai. It is the first game in the One Piece: Grand Battle series and the second game to be based on the One Piece manga and anime. This game's introduction uses the theme song  from the One Piece anime.

Plot
A boy named Monkey D. Luffy goes on a journey to become king of the pirates. During his journey he fights many foes and little by little gathers a strong and stable crew. This game is based on the East blue saga and Whiskey Peak Arc in the One Piece anime.

Gameplay

Main game
The gameplay involves two characters fighting it out in a 3D arena with items and obstacles. Items can be used to help the player beat the other character and obstacles only get in the way of the characters. In Event Battle, once the player has beaten enough enemies, each character's rival will appear. Event Battle is completed when the rival is defeated.

Playable Characters
 Monkey D. Luffy
 Roronoa Zoro
 Nami
 Usopp
 Sanji
 Kuro
 Don Krieg
 Arlong
 Buggy
 Alvida
 Chaser
 Tashigi
 Nefertari Vivi (written as "Miss Wednesday")
 Pandaman
 Mihawk
 Shanks

Reception
This game had gotten a Gold Reward at the PlayStation Awards 2002 since it had shipped over 600,000 copies after its first year.

Notes

References

External links
From TV Animation - One Piece: Grand Battle! at Bandai (in Japanese) 
From TV Animation - One Piece: Grand Battle! at GameFAQs

2001 video games
Atari games
Bandai games
Fighting games
Ganbarion games
Multiplayer and single-player video games
One Piece games
PlayStation (console) games
PlayStation (console)-only games
Shueisha franchises
Toei Animation video game projects
Video games developed in Japan